The Church of Jesus Christ of Latter-day Saints in New Mexico refers to the Church of Jesus Christ of Latter-day Saints (LDS Church) and its members in New Mexico. The first congregation of the Church in New Mexico was organized in 1895. It has since grown to 69,096 members in 137 congregations.

Official church membership as a percentage of general population was 3.34% in 2014. According to the 2014 Pew Forum on Religion & Public Life survey, 1% of New Mexicans self-identify themselves most closely with The Church of Jesus Christ of Latter-day Saints. 2% of those surveyed in New Mexico in this survey considered identified themselves as Mormon. The LDS Church is the 3rd largest denomination in New Mexico.

Stakes are located in Albuquerque (4), Bloomfield, Farmington, Gallup, Kirtland, Las Cruces, Los Lunas, Rio Rancho, Roswell, Santa Fe, and Silver City.

History

Mormons first came to New Mexico in 1846.  The LDS Church has traditionally had a strong presence in the Four Corners Region of New Mexico, settling the town of Kirtland and other surrounding areas.  Mormons found converts among the Zuni Indians.

County Statistics
List of LDS Church adherents in each county as of 2010 according to the Association of Religion Data Archives: Note: Each county adherent count reflects meetinghouse location of congregation and not by location of residence. Census count reflects location of residence which may skew percent of population where adherents reside in a different county as their congregational meetinghouse.

Stakes
As of February 2023, the following Stakes had Stake Centers in New Mexico:

Missions
On March 7, 1943, the Navajo-Zuni Mission was organized, and specialized with teaching Native Americans in their language.  This was renamed the Southwest Indian Mission on January 1, 1949.  It was renamed the New Mexico-Arizona Mission on October 10, 1972.

New Mexico became its own mission when the New Mexico Albuquerque Mission was organized on December 15, 1996, with Stanley D. Robers as mission president.

As of February 2023, New Mexico was home to two missions:

In addition to these missions, the Arizona Tucson Mission and the Texas Lubbock Mission covers portions of the state.

Temples

On March 5, 2000, the Albuquerque New Mexico Temple was dedicated by church president Gordon B. Hinckley.

On April 4, 2021, church president Russell M. Nelson announced that a temple would be built in Farmington.

Communities 
Latter-day Saints had a significant role in establishing and settling communities within the "Mormon Corridor", including the following in New Mexico:

 Carson
 Fruitland
 Kirtland
 Luna
 Pleasanton
 Ramah
 Virden
 Waterflow

See also

The Church of Jesus Christ of Latter-day Saints membership statistics (United States)
New Mexico: Religion
 Mormon Battalion

References

Further reading
.

External links
 Newsroom (New Mexico)
 ComeUntoChrist.org Latter-day Saints Visitor site
 The Church of Jesus Christ of Latter-day Saints Official site